Ancram may refer to:

 The Earl of Ancram, peerage of Scotland
Michael Ancram (born 1945), British politician
 Ancram, New York, a town in Columbia County